This is a list of aquatic animals that are harvested commercially in the greatest amounts, listed in order of tonnage per year (2012) by the Food and Agriculture Organization. Species listed here have an annual tonnage in excess of 160,000 tonnes.

This table includes mainly food fish species, but also listed are crustaceans (crabs and shrimps), cephalopods (squids and cuttlefishs), bivalves, and a reptile (softshell turtle).

Note that Oreochromis niloticus and Penaeus monodon appear twice, because substantial amounts are harvested from the wild as well as being extensively raised through aquaculture.

Summary
The 70 wild species shown in this table total 41,925,250 tonnes. Other wild species total 49,410,980 for a world total of 91,336,230 tonnes of wild, captured animals.

The 31 cultivated species shown in this table total 45,252,999 tonnes. Other cultivated species total 21,380,254 tonnes for a world total of 66,633,253 tonnes of animals cultivated through aquaculture.

Harvested aquatic animals by weight

See also

 
 
 
 
 World fish production
 Fishing industry by country
 Seafood#Types of seafood
 List of types of seafood

References

.
commercial
.